The lists below contain notable people who are from the city of Thessaloniki, listed alphabetically.

Notable Thessalonians

The following were born in or associated with Thessaloniki. Some became famous after they moved away.

A
Aaron Abiob, rabbi
Maurice Abravanel, conductor
Isaac Adarbi, casuist
Nikolaos Aggelakis
Mary Akrivopoulou, actress
Shlomo Alkabetz
Moses Almosnino
Saul Amarel, pioneer of artificial intelligence
Manolis Anagnostakis, poet
Anthimos Ananiadis, actor
Georgios Anatolakis
Antipater of Thessalonica
Cahit Arf, mathematician
Aristarchus, saint
Konstantinos Armenopoulos, Byzantine jurist whose book, the Hexabiblos, influenced Byzantine, Ottoman and Modern Greek civic code
Salamo Arouch, boxer
Ḥayyim Asahel (d. before 1746) rabbi, author
Nikolas Asimos
Michael Astrapas and Eutychios, painters
Kemal Atatürk, founder of the Republic of Turkey

B
Loukas Barlos
Refet Bele, an officer of the Ottoman Army and the Turkish Army
Mehmet Cavit Bey, Ottoman Sabbatean economist and politician who was executed for alleged involvement in an assassination attempt against Kemal Atatürk
Nâzım Bey, politician and physician who was executed for alleged involvement in an assassination attempt against Kemal Atatürk
Rene Ben Sussan, illustrator
Isaak Benrubi, philosopher
Albert Bourla
Yiannis Boutaris
Salih Bozok, an officer of the Ottoman Army, later the Turkish Army and a politician of the Republic of Turkey
Fuat Bulca, an officer of the Ottoman Army and the Turkish Army

C
Nicholas Cabasilas, Byzantine mystic
Andronicus Callistus, scholar, pioneer of the Renaissance
David Samuel Carasso, 19th-century Jewish traveler and writer
Emmanuel Carasso, freemason, Young Turk, anti-Zionist, and proponent for internationalization of Thessaloniki
Isaac Carasso, founder of Groupe Danone (Dannon yogurt)
Manolis Chiotis, composer and musician
Nuri Conker, politician and an officer of the Ottoman Army and the Turkish Army
Auguste Corteau, pen name of the Greek author Petros Hadjopoulos
Demetrius Cydones, prime minister of the Byzantine Empire
Prochorus Cydones, monk, theologian, and linguist
Saint Cyril, co-creator of the Cyrillic alphabet

D
Atanas Dalchev, poet
Traianos Dellas, footballer
Saint Demetrius, patron saint of the city

E
Epigonus of Thessalonica

F
Byron Fidetzis, cellist and conductor

G
Gus G., guitarist
Artemi Gavezou, rhythmic gymnast and Olympic silver medalist in 2016
Theodorus Gaza, humanist and translator of ancient Greek texts
Katerina Georgiadou
Philippe Gigantès, Canadian politician
Evi Gkotzaridis, historian
Şükrü Naili Gökberk, military officer in the Ottoman and Turkish armies
Demetris Th. Gotsis
Aka Gündüz, poet, composer, and politician

H
Costas Hajihristos
Nâzım Hikmet, poet
Olympia Hopsonidou, model

I
Afet İnan, historian and sociologist
Giannis Ioannidis, Greek basketball coach
Isidore of Kiev, patriarch of Russia

J

K
Eva Kaili, Member of Parliament and newscaster
Giannis Kalatzis, singer
Andronikos Kallistos, teacher of Greek literature
Takis Kanellopoulos, director
Christos Karipidis, footballer
Harry Klynn, comedian
Dimitrios Konstantopoulos, footballer
Mary Kostakidis, Australian news anchor
Christos Kostis, footballer
Georgios Koudas, footballer
Dinos Kouis, footballer
Stavros Koujioumtzis, composer

L
Zoe Laskari, actress
George-Emmanuel Lazaridis, pianist
Leo the Mathematician
Moshe Levy, chemist

M
Macedonius of Thessalonica
Thomas Magister, scholar and grammarian
Dionysis Makris, singer
Markos Mamalakis, economist
Mordechai Mano
Marinella, singer
Marsheaux, synthpop duo
Margalit Matitiahu
Rabbi Samuel de Medina, Talmudist and author
Saint Methodius, co-creator of the Cyrillic alphabet

N
Nicolaus Cabasilas, Byzantine mystic
Nightrage, metal band

O
Salih Omurtak, fourth Chief of the General Staff of the Turkish Armed Forces
Clio-Danae Othoneou, actress, musician, and pianist
Hatice Özgener, school teacher, politician, and one of the first 18 female members of the Turkish parliament

P
Alketas Panagoulias
Dimitrios Pandermalis
Ioannis Papafis
Vassilios Papageorgopoulos, champion sprinter
Stelios Papathemelis
David Pardo, Dutch rabbi, born at Salonica
Joseph Pardo, rabbi
Halil Rifat Pasha, Ottoman statesman and a Grand Vizier
Natasa Pazaïti
Philippus, epigrammatist
Patriarch Philotheus I of Constantinople, Ecumenical Patriarch of Constantinople
Philippus of Thessalonica
Pyrrhus of Thessalonica, fortificator (ca. 620–630 AD)
Evangelia Psarra, archer

Q
Jacob Querido

R
Emilios Riadis, classical composer
Georgios Roubanis

S
Sabiha Sertel, professional journalist and publisher in Turkey
Raphaël Salem, mathematician
Dimitris Salpingidis, footballer
Victoria Samanidou, analytical chemist and professor
Christos Sartzetakis, President of the Hellenic Republic
Dionysis Savvopoulos, composer
Ioannis Sfairopoulos (born 1967), basketball coach in the Israeli Basketball Premier League and EuroLeague
Solomon Sirilio, rabbi and Talmud commentator
Ahmet Zeki Soydemir, officer of the Ottoman Army and a general of the Turkish Army
Yannis Stavrou, contemporary artist
Damaskinos Stouditis, patriarchal exarch of Aitolia

T
Hasan Tahsin, Ottoman patriot of Jewish Dönmeh descent who was resisted to Greek invasion of Smyrna (İzmir) after World War I
Calliope Tatti, socialite
Natassa Theodoridou, singer
Dimo Todorovski, sculptor and artist
Makis Triantafyllopoulos
Demetrius Triclinius, scholar

U
Hasan Tahsin Uzer, bureaucrat

V
Shlomo Venezia
Evangelos Venizelos
Kostas Voutsas, actor

W

X

Y
Ahmet Emin Yalman, journalist and author

Z
Grigorios Zalykis, scholar, writer, and diplomat
Anastasia Zampounidis, German TV personality
Nikos Zisis, basketball player

References

Thessaloniki